Bossong is a surname common to Rhineland-Palatinate in Germany and Alsace in France.

Surname history 
The Bossong family is of Frankish origin. This is neither Teutonic nor French, but a separate race, almost extinct today.

When William the Conqueror of Normandy invaded England in 1066, early variations of the name were in his invading army. For their services in the conquest of England, they were awarded large estates in County Norfolk where the family may still be found.

They were likely Huguenots or Walloons as records indicate they fled Catholic persecutions during the 16th and 17th centuries. In 1572 the family suffered the persecutions of many families and refused to accept the doctrines of the Roman Catholic Church. To avoid this persecution, many families left the domains of the French King and fled to County Kent, England and Holland.

Again in the latter part of the 17th century, those who remained in France suffered persecution and fled.

Genealogical researcher Heinrich Herzog notes that the family name can be found in the Habsburgs Low Countries. During the Thirty Years' War, the Lambrecht Wallonians fled in 1621 from approaching Spanish soldiers, for example, to Bergzabern, a small town which belonged to the neutral principality Pfalz-Zweibrücken. In 1635, they escaped again from imperial troops choosing Annweiler and Bischweiler in Alsace which both belonged to Pfalz-Zweibrücken, Hanau on the river Main, and possibly to Malmedy. In the first three places, there are found bearers of the name Botzon. Starting in the 1640s, Johann Botzon is mentioned often in the council minutes of the city of Kaiserslautern.

The Bossong surname has existed in and around the town of Kaiserslautern in the Rhineland-Palatinate for the past several hundred years. The earliest known cited person with the surname Bossong was Johann Ägidius Bossong, who was born approximately 1642 in Schallodenbach.

Cultural origins 
The Franks were the race of Charlemagne, the Pepins, Dagobert I, and Charles Martel. Their capital was at Aix-la-Chappell (Aachen) in present-day North Rhine-Westphalia, near the borders of Belgium and the Netherlands. The Bossong family seat was in the town of Bussang which lies in present-day Lorraine.

Although most of the Bossongs found in Schallodenbach and surrounding farm villages were Catholic, some early church records suggest that Calvinist Bossongs lived in Heiligenmoschel. As noted earlier in this article, it appears early Bossongs were Huguenots or Walloons.

In Europe today, variations of the name can be found in several countries from the western and southern parts of the former Holy Roman Empire of the German Nation - Germany, France, Belgium, the Netherlands, Italy, and England.

Various spellings 
The spelling of the name changed over the years, and may have started as Bandeson.
The general evolution of the surname, starting in the 14th century, appears to be as follows: Bodechon --> Bodeson --> Bodson --> Botzong --> Bossong. Variations of these spellings include Bodecon, Baudeson, Baudeschon, Baudisson, Boudecon, Boudosson, Bootson, Botson, Botzon, Botzung, Bozon, Boson, Bosson, Bossung, and Bossing.

Immigration to the United States 
Along with about 1.2 million other Germans, many Bossongs emigrated from Europe in the late 19th century while war ravaged central Europe. The most popular immigration to the United States for the Germans was New York.

Today, a significant number of people with the Bossong/Bossung spellings of the name reside in New York, New Jersey, Pennsylvania, Ohio, Kentucky, Missouri, Indiana, and Illinois.

Notable people, places, and businesses 
Businesses

Bossong Medical, Asheboro, North Carolina, USA

Bossong's Commercial Delivery, Inc., Syracuse, New York, USA

Cafe Bossong, Rockenhausen, Rhineland-Palatinate, Germany

Bossong Engineering, Welshpool, Western Australia

Bossong SpA, Grassobbio, Bergamo, Italy

People

Franz Bossong, German author, poet, and publisher

Horst Bossong, German sociologist

Nora Bossong, German writer

Places

Bossung Lake, Bethel, Gosper, Nebraska, USA

Bosson, Liège, Wallonia, Belgium

Bossons Glacier, Haute-Savoie, France

Miscellaneous links 
Historic homes and places and genealogical and personal memoirs of Middlesex Cty, MA - pages relating to early Bosson settlers and families.

 Massachusetts of today: a memorial of the state, historical and biographical - Bosson pages.

Bosschaerts surname

References 

Surnames